Paul Manns (born 15 April 1961, Great Haywood, Staffordshire) was an English professional footballer who played in The Football League for Notts County and Chester City.

Playing career
Manns began his career with Cardiff City, but left for Notts County in August 1979 without making a league appearance. He spent three and a half years with County, making seven league appearances (four of them coming in the club's promotion season from Division Two in 1980–81).

In March 1983, Manns joined Division Four side Chester City on non-contract terms. Manns made his Chester debut in a 3–2 win at Swindon Town on 12 March 1983 and played in the club's final 12 games of the season, scoring three times. He impressed sufficiently to win a full contract for the following season, playing regularly in the first half of the campaign. However, he did not play again after being substituted against Bury on 3 December 1983 .

Manns' current whereabouts are not known in football circles.

References

External links
Article on Notts County promotion squad from 1981.

1961 births
Living people
People from the Borough of Stafford
English footballers
Association football midfielders
English Football League players
Cardiff City F.C. players
Notts County F.C. players
Chester City F.C. players
Brereton Social F.C. players